The precedence of Thai royalty follows a system of ranks known as thanandon, which are accompanied by royal titles.

The Sovereign
There are two styles which can be used for a king in ordinary speech, depending on whether he has been crowned:
Crowned kings: Phra Bat Somdet Phra Chao Yu Hua (เจ้า) is the style used in ordinary speech when referring to the kings of Thailand after their coronation. This style may be used in two ways:
Preceding the name of the king; e.g., Phra Bat Somdet Phra Chao Yu Hua Phumiphon Adunyadet (His Majesty King Bhumibol Adulyadej).
More formally it can be split across the name, possibly with the omission (or modification) of the words "Phra Chao Yu Hua"; e.g., Phra Bat Somdet Phra Paramintara Maha Phumiphon Adunyadet and Phra Bat Somdet Phra Paramindara Maha Prajadhipok Phra Pokklao Chao Yu Hua.
Uncrowned kings: Somdet Phra Chao Yu Hua, normally preceding the king's name, is restricted to a king who has not yet been crowned. When crowned, he assumes the title of Phra Bat Somdet Phra Chao Yu Hua; e.g., Somdet Phra Chao Yu Hua Maha Wachiralongkon Bodinthrathepphayawarangkun (His Majesty King Maha Vajiralongkorn Bodindradebayavarangkun).

Consorts
Traditionally, titles of royal wives depended on their birth titles and royal favour; only princesses of high birth (Chao Fa, Phra Ong Chao and Mom Chao Ying) assuming titles higher than Chao Chom. There were no clear rules about the hierarchy of titles above Chao Chom until the time of King Mongkut, and titles changed over successive reigns.
The rule about commoners also seems to be evolving, and it appears that there are no more restrictions on a commoner from becoming queen. Most of the titles below are from King Vajiravudh's 1924 enactment of the Succession Law.

Princes and princesses
Holders of these titles are still considered royal, since they are (at most) two generations removed from a king. Nai Luang (ในหลวง) is an epithet for a king. Children of a king are called Luk Luang (ลูก หลวง "royal children"), and grandchildren of a king are called Laan Luang (หลาน  "royal grandchildren"). The concept is similar to the French system of "princes of the blood" and the Iberian system of "infantes." In English, they are normally called "prince" or "princess". Special forms are used when one wishes to address them, although the language is less elaborate than when speaking to the king or the queen. A male Luk Luang who does not accede to the throne would assume a new royal surname, normally reflecting his birth name (as opposed to an honorific given later). The surname can be used by his wife if she is a commoner by birth, possibly with Na Ayudhya added if she has no noble title. It is otherwise not normally used until his children (or grandchildren) first hold the title of Mom Chao, when the surname will first appear in their names.

Sovereign's children

Viceroy's children

Sovereign's grandchildren

Sovereign's nephew or niece

Viceroy's grandchildren

Sovereign's great-grandchildren

Royal descendants
More distant royal progeny, starting from the children of male Mom Chao, are considered commoners. However, these commoners have titles indicating that their ancestry can be traced back to a king.

Mom Rajawongse

Mom Rajawongse (หม่อมราชวงศ์, ; abbreviated in Thai as ม.ร.ว. and in English as M. R. and translated as "His/Her Excellency") is the title assumed by children of male Mom Chao M.C.(English) M.C. After first name Informally, they may be called Khun Chai (male) or Khun Ying (female). Holders of this title are occasionally erroneously referred to as princes or princesses in older English documents; it is now more common to use the correct title, "Mom Rajawongse". If a specific title is appended, sometimes the titular may be called His/Her Grace by proclamation of the King or a Prince-Regent, but not by a Queen-regent or any royal member sitting in the King's capacity as a Councillor-of-State.

Mom Luang
Mom Luang (หม่อมหลวง, abbreviated in Thai ม.ล. and sometimes in English as M. L. and translated as "The Honourable") are the last royal descendants retaining a title. Mom Luang titles are conferred on children of male Mom Rajawongse. Colloquially (although incorrectly), they are sometimes addressed as "Mom"; the correct informal address is "Khun".

na Ayudhya

In the Family Name Act, B. E. 2465, Rama VI ordered that royal descendants who do not hold any title should append "na Ayudhya" (ณ อยุธยา) to their surname to signify they are descended from a royal bloodline. Sometime spelled "Na Ayutthaya".

Wife of prince
Wives of princes have titles, depending on the titles on both sides.

Phra Vorachaya
Phra Vorachaya is a title of the royal consort of the Crown Prince. She is elevated to Phra Chao Vorawongse Ther Phra Ong Chao.

Phra ChayaPhra Chaya is a princess, Chao Fa (HRH Princess) or Phra Ong Chao (HRH Princess) who is married to prince, at every level. She retains her own title. When referring to her as a wife of the prince, she may be called "Phra Chaya Nai (husband's name)".

ChayaChaya (ชายา) is a princess or Mom Chao (HSH Princess) who is married to prince, at every level. Again, she would retain her own title. When referring to her as a wife of the prince, she may be called "Chaya Nai (husband's name)".

MomMom (หม่อม), in this context, is a commoner married to a prince. She uses this title as a prefix of her name, adding na Ayudhya to her new surname; for example, Mom Srirasmi Mahidol na Ayudhya (a wife of Chao Fa Maha Vajiralongkorn, whose surname is Mahidol). If she has her own title (Mom Rajawongse or Mom Luang), she retains it.

Married princesses
The son of a holder of the following titles generally inherits a title one step below; a female Mom Rajawongse married to a commoner would produce a child with no title. According to the Royal Marriages Act, B. E. 2475, a princess wishing to marry to a commoner must request royal permission and abandon her royal title. For example, if princess Chao Fa, HRH Princess of Thailand, wished to marry a Mom Rajawongse commoner she would lose her royal title (Chao Fa, HRH Princess of Thailand) but retain royal style as follows: 
 Chao Fa, HRH Princess of Thailand: Tunkramom Ying (daughter of the sovereign with the queen)
 Tunkramom Ying Ubolratana Rajakanya, formerly Somdet Phra Chao Luk Thoe Chao Fa Ubolratana Rajakanya
 Chao Fa, HRH Princess of Thailand: Somdet Ying (daughter of the sovereign with the royal consort)
 Phra Ong Chao, HRH Princess of Thailand: Sadet Phra Ong Ying (daughter of the sovereign with the concubine)
 Phra Ong Chao, HRH Princess of Thailand: Phra Ong Ying (daughter of the son of the sovereign with the queen and his royal consort)
 Phra Ong Chao, HH Princess of Thailand: Than Phra Ong Ying (daughter of the son of the sovereign who was elevated from Mom Chao to Phra Ong Chao)
 Mom Chao, HSH Princess of Thailand: Than Ying (daughter of the son of the sovereign and his consort, or great-granddaughter of the sovereign)

However, Chao Fa Chulabhorn Walailak received permission from the king to keep her title when she married commoner Virayudh Tishyasarin.

 Royal peerage 

In addition to royal ranks and titles, royals may also receive noble titles in the style of the nobility. These are referred to as krom titles. While the granting of noble titles ceased with the abolition of absolute monarchy in 1932, on very rare occasions the king may still grant an honorary noble title to a royal.

The noble title, which consists of a rank and a title, is appended to the royal name and title, prefixed with the word krom (pronounced kromma when forming part of the title). For example, the full title of the King's sister is "Somdej Phra Chao Pheenang Ther Chao Fa Galyani Vadhana Kromma Luang Narathivat Rajanakarin. Nevertheless, it is the princely title which will be more frequently omitted when contracting the title e.g. Somdej Phra Chao Boromawong Ther Kromma Phraya Damrong Rajanubhab (born Phra Ong Chao Disuankumaan). There are 5 feudal titles for prince/princess:

The ranks of royal peerage are:
 Somdej Krom Phraya or  Somdet Phra: Highest rank of royal peerage, usually granted to the Queen Mother, Princess Mother and Maha Uparaj. Somdet Phra was created by Rama VI, replacing Krom Somdet.
 Queen Mothers:
 Somdet Phra Amarindra Borommarachini: HM Queen Amarindra, Queen Mother of Rama II
 Somdet Phra Suriyendra Borommarachini: HM Queen Sri Suriyendra, Queen Mother of Rama IV
 Somdet Phra Debsirindra Borommarachini: HM Queen Debsirindra, Queen Mother of Rama V
 Somdet Phra Sri Bajarindra Borommarachininat: HM Queen Sri Bajarindra, Queen Mother of Rama VI and Rama VII
 Princess Mothers: 
 Somdet Phra Sri Sulalai: HRH Princess Sri Sulalai, Princess Mother of Rama III
 Somdet Phra Srinagarindra Borommaratchachonnani: HRH Princess Srinagarindra, Princess Mother of Rama VIII and Rama IX
 Viceroys:
Somdet Phra Bowararat Chao Maha Sura Singhanat: HRH Prince Maha Sura Singhanat, Viceroy of Rama I
 Somdet Phra Bowararat Chao Maha Senanurak: HRH Prince Maha Senanurak, Viceroy of Rama II
 Somdet Phra Bowararat Chao Maha Sakdi Balasebya: HRH Prince Maha Sakdi Balasebya, Viceroy of Rama III
Krom Phra
Krom Phra Srisavangvadhana: Her Royal Highness Princess Chulabhorn, The Princess Srisavangvadhana, Daughter of Rama IX and Sister of Rama X
Kromma Luang
Kromma Khun Chao Fa starts from this title
Kromma Muen Phra Ong Chao starts from this title
Kromma Muen Suddhanarinatha: Her Royal Highness Princess Soamsawali, The Princess Suddhanarinatha, Mother of the First Child of Rama X

Since the time of King Chulalongkorn, the honorific titles given to the royalties normally incorporate a city name or its modified form, and the holders are known in English as the Prince or Princess of that city.

The sovereign may grant titles to other royal-family members: 
 Somdet Phra Prathom Borom Ratchachonok: HRH Prince Father of Rama I
 Somdet Phra'' Rupsirisobakya Mahanaknari: HRH Princess Rupsirisobakya Mahanaknari, Mother of Queen Amarindra
 Somdet Phra Piyamavadi Sri Bajarindra Mata: HRH Princess Piyamavadi Sri Bajarindra Mata, Mother of Queen Saovabha Bongsri
 Somdet Phra Sri Savarindira Barom Raja Devi: HM Queen Sri Savarindira, Queen Grandmother of Rama VIII and Rama IX
 Somdet Phra Mahitaladhibes Adulyadejvikrom Phra Borom Ratchachonok: HRH Prince Mahidol Adulyadej, Prince Father of Rama VIII and Rama IX
 Somdet Phra Debaratanarajasuda Chao Fa Maha Chakri Sirindhorn Rathasimagunakornpiyajat Sayamboromrajakumari: HRH Princess Sirindhorn, the Princess Royal (Daughter of Rama IX and Younger Sister of Rama X)

See also 
 Thai honorifics
 Rama (Kings of Thailand)
 Regnal name
 Saopha (Shan States)
 Thai nobility

Notes

References 
 Jones Robert B., 1971, Thai Titles and Ranks, Including a Translation of Royal Lineage in Siam by King Chulalongkorn, Data Paper No. 81.  Ithaca:  Southeast Asia Program, Department of Asian Studies, Cornell University
 Finestone Jeffrey, 1989, The Royal Family of Thailand:  The Descendants of King Chulalongkorn
 Rabibhadana M.R. Akin, 1996, The Organization of Thai Society in the Early Bangkok Period 1782 – 1873
 Foreign Correspondents' Club of Thailand, 2007, The King of Thailand in World Focus

External links 
 Pronunciation of Thai royal and noble titles at www.forvo.com

Thai monarchy